Anton Segner (born 24 July 2001) is a German rugby union player who plays for the Tasman Mako in the Bunnings NPC and the  in Super Rugby. His position of choice is flanker.

Early career 
Prior to 2017, Segner was playing for SC 1880 Frankfurt, one of the most traditional clubs in Germany's domestic Rugby-Bundesliga competition. He quickly established himself as one of the leading figures in the youth setup of the club and went on to win numerous German youth championships. He also captained his team, while being one of the youngest members. Segner played for Germany Under 16 national squad in 2016. He didn't play for the U18 team though, as he continued his stay in New Zealand.

New Zealand 
Segner was on a six month stay in New Zealand in 2017 as an exchange student when he was offered a scholarship by Nelson College, he was then picked for the Nelson College top side. Segner then went on to captain the Nelson College top side and led them to their first UC Championship title in twelve years in 2019. In 2018 Segner made the Crusaders Under 18 squad and made his debut for the New Zealand national schoolboy rugby union team against Tonga. In 2021, he was named captain of the  under 20 side for the Super Rugby Aotearoa Under 20 competition.

Professional rugby 
At just 19 years of age, Segner was named in the Tasman Mako squad for the 2020 Mitre 10 Cup, signing a two year deal with the side. He made his debut for the Mako in Round 7 against  in a 47-10 win for the side at Trafalgar Park. Segner became the first German to win a Mitre 10 Cup title when Tasman won the 2020 Mitre 10 Cup, beating  12-13 in the final at Eden Park, with Segner coming off the bench in the second half.

International career 
In May 2021 Segner was named in the 2021 New Zealand Under 20 squad.

References

External links
itsrugby.co.uk profile

German rugby union players
Tasman rugby union players
Living people
People educated at Nelson College
2001 births
Blues (Super Rugby) players
Rugby union flankers
Sportspeople from Frankfurt